Georgi Ivanov Markov (1 March 1929 – 11 September 1978) was a Bulgarian dissident writer. He originally worked as a novelist, screenwriter and playwright in his native country, the People's Republic of Bulgaria, until his defection in 1978. After relocating to London, he worked as a broadcaster and journalist for the BBC World Service, the US-funded Radio Free Europe and West Germany's Deutsche Welle. Markov used such forums to conduct a campaign of sarcastic criticism against the incumbent Bulgarian regime, which, according to his wife at the time he died, eventually became "vitriolic" and included "really smearing mud on the people in the inner circles." 

Markov was assassinated on a London street via a micro-engineered pellet that might have contained ricin. Contemporary newspaper accounts reported that he had been stabbed in the leg with an umbrella delivering a poisoned pellet, wielded by someone associated with the Bulgarian Secret Service. Annabel Markov recalled her husband's view about the umbrella, telling the BBC's Panorama programme, in April 1979, "He felt a jab in his thigh. He looked around and there was a man behind him who'd apologized and dropped an umbrella. I got the impression as he told the story that the jab hadn't been inflicted by the umbrella but that the man had dropped the umbrella as cover to hide his face."  It was reported after the fall of the Soviet Union that the Soviet KGB had assisted the Bulgarian Secret Service.

Life in Bulgaria 
Georgi Markov was born on 1 March 1929, in Knyazhevo, a Sofia neighbourhood. In 1946, he graduated from the Gymnasium (high school) and began university studies in industrial chemistry. Initially, Markov worked as a chemical engineer and a teacher in a technical school. At the age of 19, he became ill with tuberculosis which forced him to attend various hospitals. His first literary attempts occurred during that time. In 1957, a novel, The Night of Caesium, appeared. Soon another novel, The Ajax Winners (1959) and two collections of short stories (1961) were published. In 1962, Markov published the novel Men which won the annual award of the Union of Bulgarian Writers and he was subsequently accepted as a member of the Union, a prerequisite for a professional career in literature. Georgi Markov started working at the Narodna Mladezh Publishing house. The story collections A Portrait of My Double (1966) and The Women of Warsaw (1968) secured his place as one of the most talented young writers of Bulgaria. Markov also wrote a number of plays but most of them were never staged or were removed from theatre repertoire by the Communist censors: To Crawl Under the Rainbow, The Elevator, Assassination in the Cul-de-Sac, Stalinists and I Was Him. The novel The Roof was halted in mid-printing since it described as a fact and in allegorical terms the collapse of the roof of the Lenin steel mill. Markov was one of the authors of the popular TV series Every Kilometer (Всеки километър or At Every Milestone) which created the character of the Second World War detective Velinsky and his nemesis the Resistance fighter Deyanov.

Although some of his works were banned, Georgi Markov had become a successful author. He was among the writers and poets that Todor Zhivkov tried to co-opt and coerce into serving the regime with their works. During this period Markov had a bohemian lifestyle, which was unknown to most Bulgarians.

Writer and dissident 

Although not yet confirmed, Markov's first published work was considered to be "The Whiskey Record Holder", which was issued in the newspaper "Narodna kultura." There are at least three versions as to when he debuted as an author:
 Slav Karaslavov's version (1972) claims that Markov debuts in the newspaper "Stershel" in 1952. In the same year, signed by B. Aprilov and G. Markov, the feuilleton "The Forest of Horrors" was published in the newspaper.
 Yordan Vasilev's version (1990) – according to him, Markov debuts in the newspaper "Narodna armia" in 1951. Signed as "Georgi Markov", "The Whiskey Record Holder" (July 7, 1951) and "Bolshevik" (December 12, 1951) were published.

 Aleksander Kostov's version (1996) says that Markov debuts in the newspaper "Zemedelsko zname" in 1947. Signed as "G. Markov", many of his works, some of which are "Giordano Bruno" (February 19, 1947) and "Heinrich Heine" (February 21, 1947), were published.
 
In 1969, Markov left for Bologna, Italy, where his brother lived. His initial idea was to wait until his status with the Bulgarian authorities improved, but he gradually changed his mind and decided to stay in the West, especially after September 1971 when the Bulgarian government refused to extend his passport. Markov moved to London, where he learned English and started working for the Bulgarian section of the BBC World Service (1972). He tried to work for the film industry, hoping for help from Peter Uvaliev, but was unsuccessful. Later he also worked with Deutsche Welle and Radio Free Europe. In 1972, Markov's membership in the Union of Bulgarian Writers was suspended and he was sentenced in absentia to six years and six months in prison for his defection.

His works were withdrawn from libraries and bookshops and his name was not mentioned by the official Bulgarian media until 1989. The Bulgarian Secret Service opened a file on Markov under the code name "Wanderer." In 1974, his play To Crawl Under the Rainbow was staged in London, while in Edinburgh the play Archangel Michael, written in English, won first prize. The novel The Right Honourable Chimpanzee, co-written with David Phillips, was published after his death. In 1975, Markov married Annabel Dilke. The couple had a daughter, Alexandra-Raina, born a year later.

Between 1975 and 1978, Markov worked on his In Absentia Reports, an analysis of life in Communist Bulgaria. They were broadcast weekly on Radio Free Europe. Their criticism of the Communist government and of the Party leader Todor Zhivkov made Markov, even more, an enemy of the regime.

In 1978, Markov was killed in London (see below), allegedly by an operative connected to the KGB and the Bulgarian secret police under Zhivkov. His In Absentia Reports were published in Bulgaria in 1990, after the end of the Communist government.

In 2000, Markov was posthumously awarded the Order of Stara Planina, Bulgaria's most prestigious honour, for his "significant contribution to the Bulgarian literature, drama and non-fiction and for his exceptional civic position and confrontation to the Communist regime."

Assassination 
On 7 September 1978, Markov walked across Waterloo Bridge spanning the River Thames and waited to take a bus to his job at the BBC. While at the bus stop, he felt a slight sharp pain, as a bug bite or sting, on the back of his right thigh. He looked behind him and saw a man picking up an umbrella off the ground. The man hurriedly crossed to the other side of the street and got in a taxi which then drove away.

When he arrived at work at the BBC World Service offices, he noticed a small red pimple had formed at the site of the sting he had felt earlier and the pain had not lessened or stopped. He told at least one of his colleagues at the BBC, Theo Lirkov, about this incident. That evening he developed a fever and was admitted to St James' Hospital in Balham, where he died four days later, on 11 September 1978, at the age of 49. His grave is in a small churchyard at the Church of St Candida and Holy Cross in Whitchurch Canonicorum, Dorset.

Later investigation and aftermath 

Bernard Riley, the attending physician treating Markov, considered many possible causes of his illness, including that he had been bitten by a venomous tropical snake. Riley had the inflamed area at the back of his leg x-rayed, but no foreign object was detected at this time. Due to the circumstances and statements Markov made to doctors expressing the suspicion that he had been poisoned, the Metropolitan Police ordered a thorough autopsy of his body. Rufus Crompton performed the autopsy, noting a red mark on the back of Markov's leg. He cut a tissue sample from the area, with a matching sample from the other leg. These samples were sent for further analysis at the Porton Down chemical and biological weapons laboratory. There, David Gall, the Research Medical Officer, found a tiny pellet in the tissue sample.

The pellet measured  in diameter and was composed of 90% platinum and 10% iridium. It had two holes with diameters of  drilled through it, producing an X-shaped cavity. Further examination by experts from Porton Down could not detect any remnant of poison. Considering possible poisons, scientists hypothesized that the pellet might have contained ricin.

Porton Down scientists also thought that a sugary substance had been used to coat the tiny holes, creating a bubble that trapped the poison inside the cavities, with a specially crafted coating designed to melt at : human body temperature. After the pellet was inside Markov, the coating might have melted and the poison released to be absorbed into the bloodstream and kill him.

Regardless of whether the doctors treating Markov had known that the poison might have been ricin, the result would have been the same, as there was no known antidote to ricin at the time.

Ten days before the murder, an attempt was made to kill another Bulgarian defector, Vladimir Kostov, in the same manner as Markov, in a Paris Métro station.

KGB defector Oleg Kalugin alleged that the Bulgarian Secret Service arranged the murder with help from the Soviet KGB. Nobody has been charged with Markov's murder, largely because most documents relating to it are unavailable, probably destroyed. Kalugin said that Markov had been killed using an umbrella gun.

The British newspaper The Sunday Times reported  that the prime suspect was an Italian, Francesco Gullino or Giullino, who was last known to be living in Denmark. A British documentary, The Umbrella Assassin (2006), interviewed people associated with the case in Bulgaria, Britain, Denmark and America, and revealed that Gullino was alive and well, and still travelling freely throughout Europe.  There were reports in June 2008 that Scotland Yard had renewed its interest in the case. Detectives were sent to Bulgaria and requests were made to interview relevant individuals. Gullino died in Austria in August 2021.

In culture 
Markov's assassination is mentioned in John D. MacDonald's 1979 novel The Green Ripper when a character is murdered.

Markov’s assassination is mentioned in season two, episode seven of CSI, by Aaron as he describes people poisoned with ricin to Gil Grissom.

Markov's assassination is also mentioned in the neo-Western crime drama series Breaking Bad, season two, episode one, "Seven Thirty-Seven" as Walter and Jesse think of plans to kill Tuco Salamanca.  

It was also mentioned in an episode of The Young Ones, "Demolition" when Jerzei Balowski gets off the bus. 

In August 2018 the case was the subject of the BBC Radio 4 programme The Reunion.

Markov's assassination is used as the basis for an assassination story in the US Naval crime drama series NCIS, season seven, episode twenty-one, "Obsession". The character, Lt Hutton, is working on a classified program at the Naval Info-Ops Centre (NIOC) and is discovered to have been murdered using the same method as Markov, leading to a Soviet KGB plotline.

Markov's assassination is also mentioned in season two, episode one from “Slow Horses”, an Apple TV series. River Cartwright and Shirley point to the possibility of the same technique being used to murder a former MI6 agent, who was following a former KGB agent, possibly “Cicada”. Then River finds out that some poison was inserted into the arm, through a similar but different method.

Similar attacks 
On 11 May 2012, a German man died almost a year after having been stabbed with an umbrella in the city of Hanover. German police – who noted a resemblance to the Markov case – analyzed the syringe which the victim had managed to take from the perpetrator, and found dimethylmercury; the reported cause of death was mercury poisoning.

In 2016, police in Chennai, India solved three separate murders when the four killers confessed to having used an umbrella tipped with a potassium cyanide-filled syringe. They had ridden past the victims on a bike and jabbed them into the thigh.

See also 

 List of Eastern Bloc defectors
 List of unsolved murders in the United Kingdom
 Incidents involving ricin
 Poisoning of Alexander Litvinenko
 Salisbury poisoning
 List of journalists killed in Europe
 The Executioner (Kisyov novel)

References

Further reading

External links 
 Markov's umbrella assassin revealed. After 26 years, police hope to bring killer to justice by Nick Paton Walsh. 6 June 2005. (The Guardian)
 WNET (PBS) "Secrets of the Dead"  on investigation of the assassination.
 Georgi Markov "The Umbrella Assassination"  mvm.ed.ac.uk
"The Poison Umbrella" Yveta Kenety, in: The New Presence 4/2006, S. 46–48

 

1929 births
1978 deaths
1978 murders in Europe
1970s murders in London
20th-century Bulgarian people
Assassinated dissidents
Assassinated Bulgarian journalists
Assassinations in the United Kingdom
BBC newsreaders and journalists
BBC World Service people
Bulgaria–Soviet Union relations
Bulgarian defectors
Bulgarian emigrants to England
Bulgarian people murdered abroad
Writers from Sofia
Burials in Dorset
Cold War spies
Deaths by poisoning
Male murder victims
People killed in KGB operations
People murdered in Westminster
Radio Free Europe/Radio Liberty people
Unsolved murders in London